Wakenda is an unincorporated community in Carroll County, in the U.S. state of Missouri.

History
Wakenda was platted in 1869, and took its name from Wakenda Township. A post office called Wakenda was established in 1876, and remained in operation until 1995.

Notable person
James Fergason, an inventor, was born in Wakenda.

References

Unincorporated communities in Carroll County, Missouri
Unincorporated communities in Missouri